In the Moment: Live in Concert is a live album by American singer Dianne Reeves. It was recorded on January 20–21, 2000, at Studio Instrument Rentals Sound Stage 1 in Los Angeles, California, and released in 2000 through Blue Note Records. Reeves won her first Grammy Award for Best Jazz Vocal Album at 43rd Annual Grammy Awards.

Track listing

Personnel 
Dianne Reeves – lead vocals
Otmaro Ruiz – piano, synthesizer, background vocals
George Duke – additional keyboards, background vocals, producer, piano (track 4)
Romero Lubambo – guitar
Reginald Veal – bass, background vocals
 Rocky Bryant – drums, background vocals
 Munyungo Jackson – percussion, background vocals
 Wayne Holmes – additional background vocals, engineering
 Erik Zobler – engineering

Chart history

References

External links

In the Moment: Live in Concert on her website
In the Moment: Live In Concert by Dianne Reeves on iTunes

2000 live albums
Dianne Reeves albums
Blue Note Records live albums
Albums produced by George Duke
Grammy Award for Best Jazz Vocal Album
Live vocal jazz albums